H. Rossiter was a footballer who played inside right for Reading before moving in 1896 to Thames Ironworks, the team that went on to become West Ham United. He played for the club during their initial season of 1895–96, with his first recorded appearance a friendly against Liverpool Casuals on 4 April 1896, in which he scored. He was a regular for "The Irons" in the 1896–97 season, playing in their FA Cup game of that year against Sheppey United, and well as London League fixtures. In 1897–98, he featured only for the reserves.

References

Year of birth missing
Year of death missing
English footballers
Reading F.C. players
Thames Ironworks F.C. players
Association football inside forwards